Jonathan Azulay (born 5 May 1993) is a Swedish footballer who plays full-time for Örgryte as a defender.

Club career
On 11 January 2021, Azulay signed a three-year contract with Örgryte.

References

External links
 
 

1993 births
Footballers from Gothenburg
Swedish people of Israeli descent
Swedish Jews
Living people
Jewish footballers
Swedish footballers
Association football defenders
Sweden youth international footballers
Sweden under-21 international footballers
IFK Göteborg players
Örgryte IS players
Östersunds FK players
Degerfors IF players
Utsiktens BK players
Norrby IF players
Allsvenskan players
Superettan players
Ettan Fotboll players